General Webb  may refer to:

Alexander S. Webb (1835–1911), Union general in the American Civil War
Daniel Webb (British Army officer) (died 1771), British Army general famous for his actions during the French and Indian War
James Watson Webb (1802–1884), United States army general, diplomat, newspaper publisher and a New York politician
John Richmond Webb (1667–1724), English military leader and Member of Parliament
Marshall B. Webb (born 1961), U.S. Air Force lieutenant general 
Richard Webb (New Zealand Army officer) (1919–1990), New Zealand Army lieutenant general

See also
Evelyn Webb-Carter (born 1946), British Army major general
Tom Webb-Bowen (1879–1956), British Army brigadier general and later Royal Air Force vice air marshall
Attorney General Webb (disambiguation)